Frutos Baeza (1861–1918) was a Spanish poet and writer of the Murcian dialect.

Selected works
Palicos and marbles El Diario de Murcia, 1885
Gunpowder in salvos El Diario de Murcia, 1895
From my land: romances, sides, stories and games represented the garden of Murcia Murcia's Diary, 1897, 1899
Cajines and Scots! Editorial of my land, Murcia, 1904

See also
Murcia, Spain

Spanish male writers
People from Murcia
Murcian writers
1861 births
1918 deaths